Below are listed political parties registered at the Spanish Ministry of the Interior in 1976-2002. Note that:
 The Ministry does not appear to remove registrations if parties are dissolved or become dormant and a large number of the groups mentioned no longer exist today.
 In several cases the groups listed were electoral alliances formed to contest a specific election.
 In several cases, the registered parties are regional affiliates or branches of a nationwide party.
 Some of the organizations listed are not political parties per se. For example, a handful of youth wings of political parties are listed.
 Parties are listed in the order by which they were registered.

The listing
For political parties registered in 1976–1984, see List of registered political parties in Spain (1976–1984).
For political parties registered in 1985–1993, see List of registered political parties in Spain (1985–1993)

1994

1995

1996

1997

1998

1999

2000

2001

2002

Registered political parties
Parties